Yendayar is a village in Kottayam district, Kerala, India that is totally surrounded by hills. According to local tradition, Mr. J.J. Murphy (known as JJ to his friends and Murphy Sayippu to the people) named the place, which was to be his home until death in 1957, after his mother and the local river. Yendayar is a combination of 'yen' (my) 'thai' (mother) and 'ar' (river). Murphy had come in 1904 to the place which was a thick forest and had no name or people then. He had traveled a long way to reach there. There he established India's first successful rubber plantation. He brought workers from near and far – Kerala, Tamil Nadu, and Karnataka.

Location

Yendayar is situated in the eastern border of Kottayam District, 59 km from Kottayam, and around 11 km away from Mundakayam on the NH 220 (Kottayam-Kumily Road). All the buses to Elamkadu, Mukkulam & Vadakkemala are passes through Yendayar. Mundakayam, Koottickal and Elamkadu are the nearest towns The Nearest Railway Station is Kottayam railway station and airport is Nedumbassery.

How to reach 

 Kottayam - Manarcad - Pampady - Ponkunnam - Kanjirappally - Mundakayam - Yendayar (61 KM)
 Kottayam - Ettumanoor - Pala - Bharananganam - Erattupetta - Poonjar - Kaipally - Yendayar (59 KM)
 Cochin International Airport -  Perumbavoor - Muvattupuzha - Thodupuzha - Erattupetta - Poonjar - Kaipally - Yendayar (102 KM)
 Thiruvananthapuram - Kazhakootam - Kilimanoor - Kottarakkara - Adoor - Pathanamthitta - Ranni - Erumeli - Mundakayam - Yendayar  (161 KM)
 Kumily - Periyar - Vandiperiyar - Peerumedu - Kuttikkanam-  Mundakayam - Yendayar (64.3 KM)

Economy 
Rubber plantations are the major source of income for the local population. India's first commercially successful Rubber plantations are in Yendayar. An Irishman named John Joseph Murphy (1872 - 1957) who arrived in India in 1897 at a very young age and realized the growing importance of manufacturing Rubber and he established the India’s first successful rubber plantation in Yendayar.

Educational institutions 

 John Joseph Murphy Memorial Higher Secondary School [JJMMHSS], Yendayar
John Joseph Murphy Memorial Public School, Yendayar
Sree Gandhi Memorial UP School, Olayanadu
 Little Buds Primary School, Yendayar
 Deepa Nursery School, Yendayar

Religious centres

Churches 

 St. Mary's, Syro Malabar Church also known as Velankanni Matha Church, Diocese of Palai
 St. Joseph's Latin Church, Kottayam
 St. Jude, Syro Malabar Church

Temples 

 Sree Chelliyammal Temple, Yendayar, the goddess Chelliyammal is the main deity in this temple. The temple is considered as common to the Hindu devotees. Chelliyammal Devaswam is in control of covil's administration.
 Sree Subrahmanya Swami Temple, Mukkulam

Masjids 

 Badariyya Juma Masjid, is located in yendayar town. More than 200 Muslim families are praying at this masjid every day. This masjid consider as for all Muslim devotees.

River 

 Manimala River

Financial institutions 
 Meenachil East Urban Co-operative Bank
 Mundakayam Service Co-operative Bank
 State Bank of India, ATM

Nearest railway station 

 Kottayam (59 KM)

Nearest airports 

 Cochin International Airport  (102 KM)
 Trivandrum International Airport (168 KM)

References

Villages in Kottayam district